Rumney is a town in Grafton County, New Hampshire, United States. The population was 1,498 at the 2020 census. The town is located at the southern edge of the White Mountain National Forest.

History
Rumney was named after Robert Marsham, 2nd Baron Romney (pronounced Rumney). The town was originally granted in 1761 by Governor Benning Wentworth to settlers from Colchester and East Haddam, Connecticut. It was first settled in 1765; however, some grantees failed to comply with the charter, so Rumney was regranted to another group of settlers in 1767.

Farmers found the town's soil fertile. By 1859, when the population was 1,109, other industries included fifteen sawmills, a large tannery, and a ladder factory. The Boston, Concord and Montreal Railroad commenced service to West Rumney in 1850–1851.

Geography
The Baker River flows from west to east through the center of the town, roughly paralleled by New Hampshire Route 25. The town is part of the Pemigewasset River watershed, leading to the Merrimack River.

The town of Rumney contains several smaller villages. Rumney village, the town's central settlement, lies just north of the Baker River. Directly to the south, across the Baker River and adjacent to Route 25, is the village of Rumney Depot. The village of Stinson Lake, comprising development around the lake of the same name and at the foot of adjacent Stinson Mountain, is in the northern corner of the town, and West Rumney is located along Route 25 near the town's western border.

Rumney is home to Polar Caves Park, which is well known for its geological views and glowing rock formations. It is located along Route 25 near the town's eastern border.

Rumney Rocks
Rumney Rocks, located between Rumney village and West Rumney, is a rock climbing destination renowned for its sport climbing routes.

The majority of the climbing is found on the numerous small cliff faces on the south face of Rattlesnake Mountain, much of which lies within the White Mountain National Forest. These cliffs are mostly made of schist, with some being granite, and vary from long smooth slabs to wildly overhung roofs and aretes.

Most climbs are well bolted, with a few requiring additional protection. The climbs range from 5.0 to 5.15a, with the majority of routes falling between 5.10 and 5.12.

Demographics

As of the census of 2000, there were 1,480 people, 569 households, and 393 families residing in the town.  The population density was 35.3 people per square mile (13.6/km).  There were 879 housing units at an average density of 21.0 per square mile (8.1/km).  The racial makeup of the town was 98.04% White, 0.41% African American, 0.54% Native American, 0.41% Asian, 0.07% Pacific Islander, 0.20% from other races, and 0.34% from two or more races. Hispanic or Latino of any race were 0.61% of the population.

There were 569 households, out of which 29.9% had children under the age of 18 living with them, 57.5% were married couples living together, 6.3% had a female householder with no husband present, and 30.8% were non-families. 23.2% of all households were made up of individuals, and 8.8% had someone living alone who was 65 years of age or older.  The average household size was 2.55 and the average family size was 3.00.

In the town, the population was spread out, with 25.4% under the age of 18, 5.5% from 18 to 24, 25.9% from 25 to 44, 27.0% from 45 to 64, and 16.1% who were 65 years of age or older.  The median age was 41 years. For every 100 females, there were 102.7 males.  For every 100 females age 18 and over, there were 102.2 males.

The median income for a household in the town was $38,125, and the median income for a family was $42,895. Males had a median income of $26,594 versus $21,705 for females. The per capita income for the town was $17,169.  About 4.9% of families and 9.5% of the population were below the poverty line, including 15.0% of those under age 18 and 6.7% of those age 65 or over.

Stereographic cards

Notable people 

 Robert Burns (1792–1866), US congressman
 Nathan Clifford (1803–1881), diplomat, 19th US Attorney General, and Associate Justice of the Supreme Court
 J. J. Donovan (1858–1937), Washington state businessman, politician
 Mary Baker Eddy (1821–1910), founder of Christian Science (1879)
 Thom Hartmann (born 1951), author, herbalist and pundit
 Jonathan Myles (born 1982), Olympic luger

Sites of interest
 Mary Baker Eddy House
 Polar Caves Park
 Rumney Bible Conference

See also

New Hampshire Historical Marker No. 55: Baker River
New Hampshire Historical Marker No. 174: Loveland Bridge

References

External links

 
 Byron G. Merrill Library
 Rumney Historical Society
 New Hampshire Economic and Labor Market Information Bureau Profile
 Rumney Climbers Association
 Rockclimbing in Rumney – Dartmouth Outing Club

 
Towns in Grafton County, New Hampshire
Towns in New Hampshire
1767 establishments in New Hampshire